Malcolm Eccles (born 1969) is a utilities senior executive. Eccles is currently the Chief Executive Officer & Managing Director of the Basslink group based in Melbourne, Australia. Eccles was born in Whitehaven, Cumbria. In addition to his work with Basslink, he also serves as a Non-executive director on the boards of City Gas (Singapore) and Gippsland Water (Australia). He has also been a director and Executive Committee member of the ICPC (International Cable Protection Committee) since 2007.

Eccles has been involved in HVDC and submarine cable technology since 2002. His engineering career commenced in 1986 when he served an apprenticeship with British Nuclear Fuels Ltd (BNFL). He stayed with BNFL for 16 years, leaving the organisation in 2002 to join Siemens PTD (power, transmission & distribution), now called Siemens Energy Sector. He worked with Siemens from 2002 until 2005 splitting his time between managing the O&M contract for the HVDC Moyle Interconnector and developing a services business. He joined Basslink in 2005 originally to recruit and train operational & engineering teams and to ensure the company was ready to operate in the Australian energy market.

National Grid plc sold the Basslink Interconector to CitySpring Infrastructure Trust on 31 August 2007. Eccles was appointed CEO of Basslink on 1 September 2007. Since his appointment as CEO Basslink group has grown and now includes a wholesale telecoms business and an engineering consultancy businesses.

Eccles is actively engaged in the activities of the ICPC (International Cable Protection Committee) & CIGRE (International Council on Large Electric Systems).

Eccles is also a non-executive director of Gippsland Water in Victoria, having been appointed to the board in 2011 by the Minister of Water.

Personal life
Eccles and his wife live in Melbourne, Victoria. They share their home with one cat and two motorcycles.

References

External links
 
 
 
 http://www.larnetimes.co.uk/news/local-news/former-larne-resident-takes-up-top-australian-energy-post-1-1706320

Living people
1969 births
Date of birth missing (living people)
People from Whitehaven
English emigrants to Australia
Australian businesspeople
People from Melbourne